Soul on Ice can refer to:

Literature
Soul on Ice (book), a 1968 memoir by Eldridge Cleaver

Music
  Soul On Ice (song) a song from the Ice T album "Power" 
Soul on Ice (album), the debut album by rapper Ras Kass
"Soul on Ice" (song), a single from the Ras Kass album
Souls on Ice, the third and final album by rapper Seagram
 "Soul On Ice", the second track on rapper Ice Cube's album I Am the West

Film
Soul on Ice (film), a 2016 documentary